Jesus Balaso Tuquib (27 June 1930 – 1 August 2019) was a Filipino archbishop of the Roman Catholic Church. He was the Archbishop Emeritus of the Archdiocese of Cagayan de Oro in the Philippines. Tuquib first assumed episcopal office as Bishop of the Diocese of Pagadian.

Background

Born Jesus Balaso Tuquib on June 27, 1930, in Clarin, Bohol, Philippines, he was ordained priest on March 14, 1959.

Tuquib attended the San Carlos Minor Seminary in Argao, Cebu, Philippines. He attained his degree in theology from the San Carlos Major Seminary in Mabolo, Cebu, Philippines. In 1964, he graduated with a degree in secondary education. By 1967, he completed his doctorate in Sacred Theology from the University of Santo Tomas.

Ministry

Sacerdotal

As priest, Tuquib spent most of his pastoral work in parishes. He also lectured in seminaries.

Episcopal

Pope Paul VI appointed Tuquib to be the Bishop of the Diocese of Pagadian on February 24, 1973. During his reign as Bishop of Pagadian, the Diocese of Pagadian took over the administration and control of the schools of the Missionary Society of St. Columban, including Saint Columban College.  The transfer started what is now known as the Diocesan Schools Group of Pagadian, the network of sixteen schools under the control of the Bishop of Pagadian.

Eleven years later, Pope John Paul II appointed him as the Coadjutor Archbishop to Archbishop Patrick Cronin of the Archdiocese of Cagayan de Oro. Upon Cronin's retirement, Tuquib succeeded as Archbishop of Cagayan de Oro. On March 3, 2006, he retired and consequently became the Archbishop Emeritus.

References

20th-century Roman Catholic archbishops in the Philippines
21st-century Roman Catholic archbishops in the Philippines
1930 births
2019 deaths
People from Bohol
Roman Catholic archbishops of Cagayan de Oro
Filipino archbishops